Let's Go Extinct is the third regular album released the band Fanfarlo, released 10 February 2014 through New World Records (UK) and Blue Horizon Ventures (US). The album is loosely themed around the concept of evolution described by songwriter Balthazar as dealing with "the weirdness of being this thing we call a person and the double weirdness of other people".

The album received generally favourable reviews.

Track listing

Mastered by Ted Jensen at Sterling Sound, NYC

References 

2014 albums
Fanfarlo albums